Zhdanov may refer to:

People
Andrei Zhdanov (1896–1948), Soviet politician
Zhdanov Doctrine
Zhdanov (surname), a surname (including a list of people with the name)

Places
Zhdanov, Ukraine, name from 1948 until 1989 for Mariupol, a city and sea port
Zhdanov Shipyard, Ukraine former name of Azov ship-repair factory, Mariupol
Zhdanov, Armavir, former name of Mayisyan, Armenia
Zhdanov, Lori, a town in Lori Province, Armenia
Zhadanov, former name of Beylagan (city), Azerbaijan
Zhdanov Shipyard, Russia, former name of Severnaya Verf, Saint Petersburg

Other uses
 Soviet cruiser Zhdanov, a Soviet Sverdlov-class cruiser

See also

Zhdanovsk, Russia, former name of Zapolyarny, Murmansk Oblast
Zhdanovka River, Saint Petersburg, Russia
Zhdanivska coal mine, a coal mine in the south-east of Ukraine
Zhdanovsky Island, a peninsula on Karelian Isthmus
Zhdanovskaya (Moscow Metro), former name of Vykhino station
Zhdanovskaya line, former name of Tagansko–Krasnopresnenskaya line, Moscow Metro